Oxylobus is a genus of Mesoamerican flowering plants in the tribe Eupatorieae within the family Asteraceae.

 Species
 Oxylobus adscendens (Sch.Bip. ex Hemsl.) B.L.Rob. & Greenm. - from Hidalgo to Guatemala
 Oxylobus arbutifolius (Kunth) A.Gray - from Puebla to Guatemala
 Oxylobus glandulifer (Sch.Bip. ex Benth. & Hook.f.) A.Gray - from Veracruz to Guatemala
 Oxylobus oaxacanus S.F.Blake - Oaxaca, Chiapas
 Oxylobus preecei B.L.Turner - Oaxaca,  Puebla
 Oxylobus subglabrus R.M.King & H.Rob. - Oaxaca

 formerly included
see Phania Revealia 
 Oxylobus macrocephalus Paray - Revealia macrocephala (Paray) R.M.King & H.Rob.
 Oxylobus trinervius Moc. ex DC. - Phania trinervia DC.

References

Asteraceae genera
Flora of North America
Eupatorieae